قاصد‎  may refer to:

 Qasid (disambiguation)
 Qased (disambiguation)
 Ghased (disambiguation)

See also
 Courier 
 Messenger (disambiguation)